This is an alphabetical listing of notable printed and online music magazines.

0–9

1000°
2wice
365mag
7ball

A

Ablaze!
The Absolute Sound
Absolutely Zippo
Acoustic
Acoustic Guitar
Addicted to Noise

AllHipHop
Alternative Addiction
Alternative Press
Alternative Ulster
AltSounds
The Amazing Pudding
American Record Guide
American Songwriter
AMP
Aquarium Drunkard
Are You Scared To Get Happy?
Art Nouveau
Artcore Fanzine
Arthur
Artrocker

The Attic
Atwood Magazine
Audio
Audio Arts
Australian Musician

B

Bachtrack
BAM
Bananafish
Bandwidth Street Press
Banjo Newsletter
Bass Frontiers
Bass Guitar
Bass Musician
Bass Player
Bass Quarterly

BBC Music Magazine
Bearded
Beat
Beat Instrumental
BeatRoute
Beats Per Minute
The Believer
BenchWarmers DVD Magazine
Beyond Race
Big Cheese
The Big Takeover
Billboard
Billboard China
Billboard Greece
Billboard Indonesia
Billboard Japan
Billboard Philippines
Billboard Radio Monitor
Billboard Vietnam
Black Market
Black Music
Black Velvet
Blender
Blistering

Block Magazine
Blow Up
Bluegrass Unlimited
Blues & Rhythm
Blues & Soul
Blues Matters!
Blues News
Blues Unlimited
Blunt
Blurt (formerly Harp)
bma
BMG
BPM
Boston Rock
Brave Words & Bloody Knuckles
Bravo
Bristol in Stereo
British Bandsman
British Bluegrass News
Broadside
BrooklynVegan
Brum Beat
Bucketfull of Brains
Buddy
Burrn!
Buscadero

C

Cadence
Canadian Musician
Canadian Review of Music and Art
Careless Talk Costs Lives (also known as Careless Talk or CTCL)
Cashbox
CCM
CD Review (also known as Digital Audio and Digital Audio and Compact Disc Review)
Chainsaw
Chart Attack
Cheetah
Chicago Innerview
Chief Magazine
Christian Music Planet
Chronicles of Chaos
Chunklet
Circus
City Fun
Clash
Classic FM
Classic Rock
Classica
Classical Music
Classic Pop
Classical Recordings Quarterly (formerly Classic Record Collector)
Club Fonograma
CMJ New Music Monthly
Coda
Colorado Music Buzz
Comes with a Smile
Cometbus
Complete Music Update (formerly College Music Update)
Complex
Computer Music
Consequence
Country Music
Country Music News
Country Standard Time
Crack
Crawdaddy
Creem
The Cricket

Cross Rhythms
Cure
CyberPsychos AOD
Cyclic Defrost
Cymbiosis

D

Dance Music Authority (DMA)
Dance Music Report (formerly Disco News, later DMR)
Dancing Astronaut
Death to the World
De:Bug
Decibel
Deep Water Acres
The Deli
denim delinquent
Diapason
Digital Music News
Dirty Linen
Disc
Disco 45

DIY
DJ Magazine (or DJ Mag)
Dork
Double Dance
DownBeat
Drowned in Sound
Drum!
Drum Media
Dwight's Journal of Music

E

Ear
Earmilk
Ear for Music
Echoes (formerly Black Echoes)
Ego Trip
Electronic Beats
Electronic Cottage
Electronic Musician
Elmore Magazine
Enderrock
ENZK
The Etude
Exclaim!
Experimental Musical Instruments

F

Far Out
Fabulous 208
The Face
FACT
The Fader
Fanfare
Fast Folk (formerly The CooP)
Fast Forward
Film Score Monthly
Filter
Flexipop
Flipside (formerly Los Angeles Flip Side)
Flux
Fluxblog
The Fly
FMQB
Foggy Notions
Foley
Folk Den
Folk Review
Folker
Forced Exposure
Foxy Digitalis
Freak Out!
FRET
Fretboard Journal
Frontpage
fRoots (formerly Folk Roots)
Furia Musical
Fused
Fusion
FutureClaw
Future Music

G

Gaffa
Gasoline
Gavin Report
Gigwise
Global Rhythm
Go-Set
God Is in the TV
Goldberg Magazine
GoldenPlec
Goldmine
Gonzo (circus)
Gorilla vs. Bear
Gothic Beauty
Graffiti
Gramophone
Greed Magazine
Grooves

Guitar for the Practicing Musician
Guitar Player
Guitar World
Guitarist

H

Halftime Magazine
Hard Metal
Harmonica World
The Harmonicon
Harp
hartbeat!
Has It Leaked

Hi-Fi News & Record Review
High Fidelity
High Voltage
Hip Hop Connection
Hip Hop Weekly
Hip Hop World
HipHopDX
HiphopLE
Hipster Runoff
Hit Music
Hit Parader
Hits
The History of Rock
HM
Homocore
Hot Press
Hot Wacks
Hugi
huH
HUMO
Hype

I

IAJRC Journal
idiomag
Impose
In Tune Monthly

Industrialnation
Innerloop

Inpress
The Instrumentalist
International Musician and Recording World
International Record Review
International Times
Invisible Oranges
Irish Music
Is this music?
It's Psychedelic Baby!
IZM

J

Jazz & Pop
Jazz at Ronnie Scott's
Jazz Forum (British)
Jazz Forum (Polish)
Jazz Hot
Jazz Improv
Jazz Journal
Jazz Magazine
Jazz Review
The Jazz Review
Jazzenzo
Jazzman
JazzTimes
JazzWeek
Jazzwise
J.D.s
Jefferson Blues Magazine
Jockey Slut
Journal of Music
Juice (American)
Juice
Juice (German)
Juke Blues
Juke Magazine

K

Kerrang!
Keyboard
Kill Your Pet Puppy
Kludge
KRLA Beat

KtmROCKS

L

L.A. Record

Latin Beat Magazine
laut.de
Legends Magazine
Let It Rock
Limelight
The Line of Best Fit
Livewire
Living Blues
The Living Tradition
London in Stereo
Lords of Rock
Loud and Quiet
Louder Than War
Loudwire

M

M Music & Musicians (M)

Madhouse
The Mag
Magic
The Magical Music Box (or The Music Box)
Magnet
Making Music
The Maud Powell Signature, Women in Music (or Signature)
Maximum Rocknroll (MRR)
Melodic

Melody Maker

Mersey Beat
Metal
Metal.de
Metal Edge
Metal Forces
Metal Hammer
Metal Maniacs
Metal Rules
Metal Storm
Metronome
The Mississippi Rag
Mix
Mixmag
Modern Drummer
Modern Fix
Mojo

More
movmnt
MP3
Music Connection
Music Express
Music Feeds
Music Industry Online
The Music
The Music Network
The Music Scene (or )
The Music Trades
Music Week

Musical America
Musical Courier
The Musical Leader
Musical Opinion
Musician
MusicRow
Musics
Musicworks

Muzik

N

Country Weekly
Nation19
The Nerve

New Music Weekly
New Musical Express (NME)
New Noise Magazine
New Reform Magazine
New York Rocker
NewMusicBox
Next Magazine
Nightshift
Nine-O-One Network
No Cure
No Depression
Nothing but Hope and Passion (NBHAP)
Notion
Number One

O

OffBeat

OP Magazine
Opera
Opera Canada
Opera News

Option
Opus

Organ
The Organ
Orkus

Outburn
Oxford American
Ozone

P

PA Music Scene
Painkiller
Paper
Parterre Box
Paste
People's Songs
Perfect Sound Forever
Performer
Permission
Peroxide
Phlow
Phonograph Record
Phonograph Monthly Review
Pigeons & Planes 
Pitchfork
The Pitchfork Review
Pizzicato
Plan B
Planet Sound
Pollstar
Pop & Rock
Pop Culture Press
Pop Express
The Pop Manifesto
PopMatters
PORK
The Positives
Pound
Powerline
Premier Guitar
Profane Existence
Prog
Ptolemaic Terrascope
Pulp
Pulse!
Punk
Punk Globe
Punk Planet
Punk Rock Confidential

Q

Q
The Quietus

R

R2
R&B Showcase
R&R
Radio & Records
The Ragtime Ephemeralist
Rap-Up
Rated R&B
Rave
Raw
The Raw Report DVD-Magazine
Ray Gun
Razorcake
Reax
The Record
Record Collector
Record Mirror
The Record
Record Retailer
Record World
Redefine
(RED)Wire
Reggae Report
Release Magazine
Relix
Remix
RēR Quarterly
resident
Resident Advisor
RESPECT.
Retila
Revolver

Rhythm
Rhythms
Riff Raff
Rip It Up (Australian)
Rip It Up (New Zealand)
 (1960s)
 (1980s–90s)
Roadrunner
Rock
ROCKRGRL
Rock & Folk
Rock-A-Rolla
Rock and Roll Popular 1
Rock Australia Magazine (RAM)
Rock Express
Rock Hard
Rock N Roll Experience
Rock on Request
Rock Sound
Rock Street Journal (RSJ)
Rockdelux
Rockerilla
The Rocket
Rockin'On Japan
Rolling Stone
Rolling Stone (Australia)
Rolling Thunder
Ronnie Scott's Jazz Farrago
RPM
RSQ
RWD
Ryan's Gig Guide

S

 (later )
Sandman

Scratch
Screamer
The Second Line
Select
Sentimentalist (formerly The Sentimentalist)
SFX Cassette Magazine
Shindig!
Shook
Shoxx
Side Stage

Sing Out!
Singersroom
The Skinny
Skyscraper

Slant Magazine
Slash
Slug and Lettuce
Sluggo!
Smash Hits
Sniffin' Glue
Songlines
Sonic Seducer
SoulTracks
Soul Shine
Soul Underground
Sound & Vision (formerly Stereo Review)
Sound on Sound
Soundboard
Sounds
SoundsXP
The Source
Source: Music of the Avant Garde (or Source Magazine)
Spex
Spin
Spirit of Metal
Spuno
Sruti
State
Stealth
Stereogum
Storyville
The Strad
Straight No Chaser
Stranger
Streetsound
Street Cred
Stylus Magazine
Subkulture
Suburban Voice
Sun Zoom Spark
'SUP Magazine

Switch
Synapse

T

TAGG – The Alternative Gig Guide
Tape Op
Taplas
Teen Now
TeenSet
The Telegraph
Tempo
Teraz Rock
Terrorizer
Texas Music
Tilllate (formerly M8)
Time Off
Tiny Mix Tapes
The Tip Sheet
Tom Tom Magazine

Top 40
Top of the Pops
Top Pops
Total Guitar
Touch and Go
Triple J Magazine
Trouser Press
True Tunes News
Tylko Rock

U

Ugly Planet
Ugly Things
UKChartsPlus
Ukrainian Gothic Portal
Uncut
Under the Radar
The Unsigned Guide
Unsung Hero
URB

V

VAN
Variance
Variety
Vegas Rocks!
Venus Zine
Vibe
VIBE Vixen
Vintage Guitar
The Vinyl Factory
Vive Le Rock
Volume
Vox

W

WAMM (Windsor Arts & Music Monthly)
Wasted Youth
Wax Poetics
The Western Way
What Hi-Fi? Sound and Vision
What's On The Hi-Fi
Who Put the Bomp
The Wire
WOM
Women in Music
Wonka Vision
The Word

X

XLR8R
XXL

Y

Young Guitar

Z

Zero
Zero Tolerance
ZigZag
Zillo
Zoo World

See also
Lists of magazines

Music